The Point of View For my Work as an Author (subtitle: A Direct Communication, Report to History)  is an autobiographical account of the 19th century Danish philosopher Søren Kierkegaard's use of his pseudonyms.

Overview
The work was written in 1848, published in part in 1851 (as On my Work as an Author), and published in full posthumously in 1859.  This work explains his pseudonymous writings and his personal attachment to those writings.  Walter Lowrie, a Kierkegaardian translator and scholar called this an autobiography "so unique that it has no parallel in the whole literature of the world."

However, Kierkegaard did make the following remarks in The Point of View that cast doubt on whether he regarded the pseudonymous writings as highly as he did his Christian writings. He published Either/Or under the pseudonym, Victor Eremita, February 20, 1843, and Two Edifying Discourses, May 16, 1843 under his own name. The Point of View is his own interpretation of his work up to 1848. He had just published Works of Love in 1847, where he attempted to explain how to love your neighbor as yourself.

Criticism
Benjamin Nelson wrote the Preface to Lowrie's 1962 translation of Kierkegaard's Point of View. He noted the dates the book was written and published. 
Consider the principal dates associated with The Point of View — 1859, the year when the work was first published, and 1848, the year when it was written. Both dates recall publications which revolutionized the worlds of thought and experience: the former, the Origin of Species, by a retiring British botanist, Charles Darwin; the latter, The Communist Manifesto, by Karl Marx and Friedrich Engels, Kierkegaard’s fellow auditor — along with Bakunin, Herzen, Feuerbach and other notable figures — of Schelling’s Berlin lectures in 1841. 
Is it not odd that we look to this melancholy and splenetic Dane, who seemed to so many of his forward-looking contemporaries a ‘misanthropic traitor against mankind’, to be a foremost champion in the defense against the perversions of thought and existence which have been sired by the humanitarian spokesmen for ‘scientific eugenics’ and ‘scientific socialism’? Benjamin Nelson’s Preface to The Point of View by Soren Kierkegaard 1859 Lowrie translation 1962 p. xviii

Notes
 Essential Kierkegaard, p. 449

References
 Hong, Howard V. and Edna H. Hong, eds. (2000).  The Essential Kierkegaard. Princeton, New Jersey: Princeton University Press. pp. 544. ; 
 Søren Kierkegaard, The Point of View of My Work as An Author: A Report to History, and related writings, written in 1848, published in 1859 by his brother Peter Kierkegaard. Translated with introduction and notes by Walter Lowrie, 1962, Harper Torchbooks. pp. 170.

1859 books
Books by Søren Kierkegaard
Philosophy essays